Mack Air is an Air Charter airline based in Maun, Botswana. The company has been operating in northern Botswana since 1994. 

The company provides aircraft for charter, scenic, medical evacuation, and services a wide range of tourist destinations within Botswana and the Southern Africa region; as well as providing supply flights to camps and lodges within the Okavango Delta and Kalahari regions of Botswana.

The Botswana Travel Guide says of the airline that it "maintains a good reputation as an reliable, high-quality air charter company which doesn't have ties to any of the camps."

History
In 2007 Mack Air employed 15 people and in 2019 reported 50 employees, including 19 pilots. By 2021 it had 110 employees, including 30 pilots.

In 2017, the company took delivery of ten new Cessna Grand Caravan EXs as part of its fleet expansion.

In 2019, Mack Air became the first private commercial operator in Botswana to be issued an International Scheduled Air Service Licence. It started scheduled service from Botswana to Namibia in April 2020.

Accidents and incidents
On 6 January 2010 the company's Cessna 208 crashed and was "extensively damaged" upon takeoff from Piajio Airstrip, Chief's Island, Okavango Delta, Botswana when its engine failed. The aircraft landed on a wet flood plain and overturned. The pilot and the five passengers were all injured, including one passenger who suffered a broken hip. The pilot and four of the injured passengers were evacuated to a South African hospital.

Destinations 
Following is a list of destinations Mack Air flies to as part of its scheduled services, :

Fleet
Cessna Citation M2
Cessna 208 Grand Caravan EX
Cessna 210 Centurion
GippsAero GA8 Airvan

References

External links

Airlines of Botswana
Tourism in Botswana
Botswana companies